Mirny is a rural locality (a settlement) and the administrative center of Mirnensky Selsoviet, Rodinsky District, Altai Krai, Russia. The population was 1,552 as of 2013. There are 13 streets.

Geography 
Mirny is located 9 km north of Rodino (the district's administrative centre) by road. Rodino is the nearest rural locality.

References 

Rural localities in Rodinsky District